Deutschlandtakt, also known as Deutschland-Takt or D-Takt for short (Englisch: Germany clock), refers to a concept for an integrated interval timetable coordinated throughout Germany, with which a target timetable is drawn up for local and long-distance rail passenger transport and on the basis of which new lines and other infrastructure measures are to be implemented. The target timetable provides for a half-hourly service on the most important long-distance rail connections. The service concept for the Deutschlandtakt assumes a doubling of passenger numbers on local and long-distance rail services.

References

External links 

 Official website (German)

Transportation planning
Rail transport in Germany